Keeper of the Lost Cities  is an upper-middle-grade fantasy series by Shannon Messenger that has appeared on the New York Times bestseller list for a total of ten weeks. The first book in the series was an Association for Library Service to Children tween recommended read in 2013. The series first charted following the release of the 5th installment, Lodestar, on the week of November 20, 2016. The seventh book in the series Flashback had a first printing of 150,000 copies and Shannon Messenger's three-week tour to promote the book drew crowds of 200-700 people per event.

Series

Plot 
The series tells the story of Sophie Foster, a twelve-year-old high school senior with the ability to read minds. She lives in San Diego, California until a teenager with the same power, Fitz Vacker, contacts her. He tells her that she is an elf, a race with dozens of genetic-based "special abilities" (her telepathy among them), and she must move to the Lost Cities, a hidden civilization where elves and other fantasy races live. She is forced to leave her human family behind and stay with an Elvin couple, Grady and Edaline Ruewen, who later adopt her. She starts school at Foxfire, the school for Elvin nobility. She eventually discovers that she has dangerous and illegal secrets hidden in her mind, planted there by the Black Swan, a rebel group who is later revealed to have planted Sophie in the human world. They aim to shift the oligarchy under which the Lost Cities operate, with a central Council at its head. The main antagonist group of the series is the Neverseen, an extreme criminal organization at odds with the Black Swan.

The story has continued over ten books as of November 2022, with one book released each year, as well as Unlocked (book 8.5) and four short stories in limited editions. The ninth book, the most recent installment, was released on November 8, 2022. The series was originally projected to conclude with an as yet untitled book 10, but Shannon Messenger has since said she is not sure if a book 11 will be required.

Books In The Keeper of the Lost Cities Series 
 Book 1: Keeper of the Lost Cities (October 2, 2012)
 Book 2: Exile (October 1, 2013)
 Book 3: Everblaze (November 4, 2014)
 Book 4: Neverseen (November 3, 2015)
 Book 5: Lodestar (November 1, 2016)
 Book 6: Nightfall (November 7, 2017)
 Book 7: Flashback (November 6, 2018)
 Book 8: Legacy (November 5, 2019)
 Book 8.5: Unlocked (November 16, 2020)
 Book 9: Stellarlune (November 8, 2022)

Unlocked is a novella and is considered to be book 8.5 in the series. It is a departure from the writing style of the previous books, with chapters alternating between multiple characters' perspectives. It also includes a series guide and extras like recipes and official art of the characters, drawn by Laura Hollingsworth.It also includes many files on the diffrent charechters  

The Barnes & Noble special editions of Nightfall, Flashback and Legacy include short stories from the perspectives of characters Keefe Sencen, Fitz Vacker, and Tam Song, respectively. The paperback edition of Flashback includes another short story from Keefe's perspective, and the paperback edition of Unlocked includes a short story from Linh Song's perspective. No other special editions are set to release at this time.

An illustrated and annotated trade paperback edition of the first book was released on August 25, 2020.

Reception 
The series' reception was largely positive. Kirkus Reviews said of the first book: "wholesome shading to bland", but "well-stocked with exotic creatures and locales, plus an agreeable cast." Booklist Reviews called it a "exciting start to a promising series."

Film adaptation
On January 11, 2021, it was announced that Ben Affleck would be directing an adaptation of Keeper of the Lost Cities for Walt Disney Pictures. The release date and cast have not been announced.

Characters

Main characters
 Sophie Foster: The main protagonist of the Keeper of the Lost Cities series. Her genes, sourced from two unknown elves, were tweaked by a rebel group called the Black Swan, giving her powerful Elvin abilities, including telepathy, polyglotism, enhancing, inflicting, and teleportation. She was raised by humans after her experimentation and brought back to the Lost Cities at age twelve to complete her education at the Foxfire Academy.
 Keefe Sencen: Sophie's close friend and boyfriend, who is an Empath, a special ability allowing him to detect others' feelings. He also becomes a Polyglot, capable of speaking all languages, and manifests an unnamed ability of emotional manipulation. 
 Fitzroy "Fitz" Vacker: Sophie's close friend and second love interest. He is a highly skilled Telepath and becomes Sophie's Cognate, making them a close telepathic pair. He belongs to a prominent family of Elvin nobility.
  Dexter “Dex” Dizznee: Sophie’s best friend, a talented alchemist with Technopathy, the ability to manipulate technology.
 Biana Vacker: Sophie’s friend and Fitz’s younger sister. She is a Vanisher, allowing her to turn invisible.
 Tam Song: Sophie’s friend from Exillium, a school for banished and or "unruly" elves, who is a Shade, capable of manipulating shadows
  Linh Song: Tam’s twin sister, also previously a student (a "Wayward") at Exillium, who has the ability to control water, Hydrokinesis. 
 Marella Redek:Sophie's gossipy friend with a rare and illegal special ability, pyrokinetic, letting her summon fire and bend it to her will.
 Wylie Endal: The son of Prentice Endal, a key member of the Black Swan, who is a Flasher, sensing and manipulating colors of light.

Supporting characters 
 Alden Vacker: Fitz and Biana’s father, and Sophie’s mentor and confidant.
 Edaline Ruewen: Sophie’s adoptive mother, a Conjurer, who has the ability to summon items from far away.
 Grady Ruewen: Sophie’s adoptive father, a Mesmer, who can control what others do through hypnotism.
 Sandor: Sophie’s goblin bodyguard, assigned in Exile.
 Errol Loki Forkle: Two members of the Black Swan's Collective, their leaders, who were identical twin brothers under one identity, sharing their memories and experiences through telepathy. As prominent members of the Black Swan who designed Sophie's hidden memories, they were also Sophie’s guardians as she grew up in the human world.
 Prentice Endal: A Keeper for the Black Swan, who had the role of storing important information deep in his mind. He sacrificed his sanity to keep Sophie hidden among humans. Prentice is the father of Wylie Endal.
 Jensi Babblos: Sophie’s exuberant friend, who meets her on her first day at Foxfire. He has not manifested a special ability
 Maruca Chebota: Wylie’s cousin and Biana’s former best friend. She manifests the ability to make force fields, Psionipathy, in Legacy.
 Stina Heks: A school bully who later warms up to Sophie. She is an Empath.
Amy Foster (Natalie Newman): Sophie's human 'sister'. She knows about the elf world.

References

American children's book series
21st-century children's literature
Book series introduced in 2012